The long-tailed glossy starling (Lamprotornis caudatus) is a member of the starling family of birds. It is a resident breeder in tropical Africa from Senegal east to Sudan.

This common passerine is typically found in open woodland and cultivation. The long-tailed glossy starling builds a nest in a hole. The normal clutch is two to four eggs.

This ubiquitous bird is gregarious and noisy, with a harsh grating call.

The face is black with a yellow eye. The sexes are similar, but juveniles are duller, with a brownish tone to the plumage.

Like most starlings, the long-tailed glossy starling is an omnivore, eating fruit and insects.

References

long-tailed glossy starling
Birds of Sub-Saharan Africa
long-tailed glossy starling
long-tailed glossy starling